is a Japanese actor, singer, television host, radio personality. He was the youngest member of SMAP, one of the best-selling boy band in Asia. After the group's disbandment on 31 December 2016, Katori has been pursuing his solo career. He left Johnny & Associates on 9 September 2017, together with two other SMAP members, Goro Inagaki and Tsuyoshi Kusanagi and entered CULEN, a Japanese talent agency. On 22 September 2017, they launched a new project, "atarashiichizu" ("新しい地図", meaning "New Map") as their common fan site, supported by various Japanese leading creators. Since then, Katori has been extending his activities also into artistic fields.

Early life
Katori was born in Yokohama, Kanagawa and moved to Tokyo to pursue his career. He has one younger brother.

Career as a pop star

Music

In 1987, at age 10, Katori auditioned for Johnny & Associates, a Japanese talent agency that recruits and trains young boys, preteens to teens, to become singers and members of boy bands. After five of the other band members auditioning individually from 1986 through 1987, in autumn 1987, twenty boys, from ages ten to seventeen, were put together into a group called The Skate Boys, which was initially created as backup dancers for a famous boy band, Hikaru Genji. In April 1988, producer Johnny Kitagawa chose six out of the twenty boys to create a new boy band and named them "SMAP".

On January 1, 2020, Katori released his first solo album, entitled "20200101". The album features songs written by Katori, as well as collaborations with artists such as TeddyLoid, BiSH, Kreva, Kishidan, and Scha Dara Parr, and more. The album is said to be a celebration of the year 2020, with both the 2020 Summer Olympics and 2020 Summer Paralympics were scheduled to be held during that year. In 2021, Katori held his first solo concert entitled "Sakura Saku Rekishi Aru Meijiza de 20200101 ni Wani Wa Waiwai Katori Shingo", at the Meiji-za from April 4, 2021, to April 29, 2021. Katori also live streamed the last day of the concert on the streaming platform AbemaTV.

Katori's second solo album entitled "Tokyo SNG" was released on April 13, 2022. Inspired by numerous styles of jazz, from standard style to big band jazz, Katori wished to evoke the feeling of hearing "jazz in a tuxedo". He also contributed to writing some of the songs on the album, such as the titular "Tokyo SNG",  "Kongaragatte", "Shingopation", and "Catharsis", to name a few. The album also features collaborations with WONK, Atarashii Gakko!, and the Zazen Boys.

On January 3, 2023,  it was announced that Katori would be collaborating with popular K-Pop group Seventeen for a brand new song entitled "BETTING", to serve as the theme song for fellow ex-SMAP member Tsuyoshi Kusanagi's latest drama, War of Traps. Katori had met the group the year prior, leading to them collaborating on a song together. BETTING was co-produced by Katori, PLEDIS Entertainment producuer Bumzu, and SEVENTEEN member Woozi. Katori serves as the main vocal on the track, performing alongside SEVENTEEN's Mingyu, Jeonghan, and Seungkwan. It was released on streaming platforms on January 17, 2023.

Acting
In 1988, he made his acting debut in a television series, Abunai Shonen III, along with his band members. After several supporting roles, in 1996, he landed his first major role in a drama television series, Tomei Ningen, which became a massive success. He has also starred in many high-rated television series, such as Hito ni Yasashiku (2002), Saiyuki (2006), and Bara no nai Hanaya (2008). In 2004, he starred in NHK's Taiga drama, Shinsengumi!. He is also a member of the Mitani Crew, a core group of actors that Japanese playwright Kōki Mitani tends to use in his work.

In 2021, Katori starred in TV Tokyo's drama entitled Anonymous: Keishicho ”Yubisatsujin” Taisakushitsu. This was his first lead role on a TV Tokyo drama series, as well as his first broadcast drama series after five years. He also performed the main theme for the series, entitled "Anonymous (feat. WONK)", and released it on both digital storefronts and streaming platforms on February 1, 2021.

Shingo Mama
From October 1998, Nakai and Katori launched their own variety program, SataSma, which was created and aimed towards younger viewers and families. Katori starred in a segment titled, "Shingo Mama's Secret Breakfast", where Katori would cross-dress into a character called "Shingo Mama", and visit houses to cook breakfast for children instead of their mother, allowing her to sleep in and rest in the morning. Katori started to use the phrase, "Ohha", a pun for "Ohayo", meaning "good morning", during the segment as his trademark phrase, which soon became a popular word used among children. Shingo Mama, the lovable character Katori played, and the phrase "Ohha", became a social phenomenon. As a result, SMAP incidentally brought in kindergartners and preteens to their fan base.

On 16 August 2000, Katori released a single, "Shingo Mama's Oha Rock", as Shingo Mama, which reached number one on the charts with over 1,200,000 physical copies sold and became a social phenomenon. In December 2000, the trademark phrase "Ohha", used by Katori, won the Ryukougo Taisho, an annual traditional event of announcing words that describes that year. From 2000 to 2001, Shingo Mama promoted the use of Ohha as part of a Ministry of Education campaign to encourage family communication.

Artistic career 
"I’ve always loved painting for as long as I can remember," he said in an interview in his first book of illustration collection. He thinks he came to like painting because of the family background (his further was an art dealer). Katori displayed his artistic talent also at SMAP's concerts. He became in charge for staging of the concert tours, beginning from "super.modern.artistic.performance" (2008) through "We are SMAP" (2010) and "Gift of SMAP" (2012) until "Mr. S – saikou de saikou no CONCERT TOUR" (2014).

Katori has been creating and engaged in various artworks and projects:

 Painting on Tsugaru Railway's train car (1997). As a special project in the SMAP's long-run television variety show, “SMAPxSMAP”, Katori painted a train car together with local children. After the car ended its service in 2000, it was kept at Kanagi Station for the purpose of exhibition, then moved to Kase Station. In 2017, 20 years after the painting was made, Katori visited the Kase Station again in a TV show (“Oja MAP!!”) in order to restore the work. The car is now one of the touristic attractions in the region and visited by Katori's fans.
 Shingo no Itazura, an illustration collection book (1998), contains pictures published on magazine Wink Up and some new works created for this book.
 SNAP NO SHINGO, a photo diary for the period of one year from 16 October 2004 until 15 October 2005. The pictures were originally taken for "SmaTIMES" weekly paper published by a TV news variety show "SmaSTATION".
 Painting "Takarabako" ("Treasure Box", 2011). Appointed as an ambassador for a Cirque du Soleil show called "Kooza" in Japan, he painted a picture on a large canvas (1,800 x 1,500 mm), featuring characters and contents of the show. The painting was exhibited in the foyer during the Kooza's performance in Japan.
 Artwork "Kūsō Tamago" ("Fantasy Egg", 2014). After successful mission for "Kooza", Katori was again appointed as an ambassador for the next Cirque du Soleil"s performance in Japan, "OVO" and created an artwork featuring its motive "ovo", which means an "egg" in Portuguese. The artwork accompanied the show around Japan.
 Fashion Photo Book Fuku Baka Shifukubon (roughly "a book of happiest private wardrobe of a fashion freak", 2014). A photo book featuring Katori, known as a fashion freak, in his private clothes, coordinated by a noted fashion stylist, Tomoki Sukezane. For this book, Katori's private wardrobe was transported from his flat to the photo studio by two 2-ton trucks. The estimated total value of the "collection" built-up over 15 years was 200 million Yen.
 Art Exhibition "Museum of Together" held by The Nippon Foundation, at Aoyama Spiral Garden, Tokyo, Japan for 13–31 October 2017. With other 22 artists, Katori joined in the exhibition with his two paintings, "Hinotori" ("Fire Bird", 2014) and "Isoge mada maniau" ("Hurry Up, We Are Going to Be on Time", 2010). It was his first participation in an art exhibition.
 A special exhibition celebrating the 100th anniversary of Cartier’s icon watch TANK, at Cartier in Roppongi Hills, Tokyo, Japan for 28 October – 26 November 2017. Inspired by the legendary timepiece of the French luxury brand, Katori created a painting and an art work.
 Graffiti in Hong Kong, at the corner of Hollywood Road and Shalley Street, Old Town Central, unveiled on 27 March 2018. Requested by Hong Kong Tourism Board, a government-subvented body, Katori completed the graffiti on a 4.5m-high and 6m-wide wall beside the Mid-Levels Escalator within 18 hours. As the project was to be kept confidential, he worked with the covered wall for 3 continuous nights from midnight until 6 am.
 Exhibition "NAKAMA de ART" at the Imperial Hotel Plaza, Tokyo, Japan for 24 May – 24 June 2018. Together with 13 emerging artists he selected, Katori organized an art gallery under the name of "NAKAMA de ART". A literal translation of "nakama" is "buddy" or "mate", so the exhibition title could roughly mean "Let's do art together".
Car Wrapping on BMW X2 (2018). Appointed as a "Brand Friend" of a BMW's SUV model X2, Katori was featured in its concept movie (a part of which was streamed also as TV advertisement later) and designed the car wrapping. The wrapped vehicle was exhibited at some special events.
Fashion Brand and Permanent Pop-up Shop "jantje_ontembaar". Together with a noted stylist Tomoki Sukezane who knows Katori over 20 years, Katori started-up a fashion brand and opened its own boutique at the Imperial Hotel Plaza under concept "Permanent Pop-up Shop", meaning "a shop with ever changing contents for an unlimited period of time". The brand collaborates with well-respected manufacturers such as Sanyo Coat (by Sanyo Shokai), MINEDENIM and Borsalino. The brand name "jantje_ontembaar" comes from Dutch words "jantje" and "ontembaar" which are said to be origins of Japanese words "yancha" and "otenba", naughty boy and girl. With that, Katori and Sukezane want to encourage people to keep a heart of a child and think out-of-the-box.
 Exhibition "NAKAMA des ARTS" in Hall Charles V in the Louvre Museum (Carrousel du Louvre), Paris, France for 19 September – 3 October 2018. Katori's first solo exhibition occurred within the framework of Japonismes 2018, a cultural festival organized by France and Japan to celebrate the 160th anniversary of diplomatic relation between the two countries.
Painting of Tokyo Tower. On the occasion of the 60th anniversary of the Tokyo Tower, the national public broadcasting of Japan, NHK put a special program "Miagereba anata wa itsumo sokoni" ("Thank you for being there every time when I look up") on air on 22 December 2018. In this program, Katori painted a picture featuring the Tokyo Tower. Katori often says that he likes the Tokyo Tower very much and the tower has been encouraging him a lot since he started his career in show business as a 11-year-old boy. In this work, he put colors on a night scenic photo of Tokyo he took by himself. It was the first time he utilized this art technique. The painting was exhibited on the Main Deck of the Tokyo Tower for the period from 2 February until 8 March 2019, then in "boum! boum! boum!" (see below), Katori's first solo exhibition in Japan after the world's premiere in Paris, France in 2018.
Painting "New Year Woman". For the first issue of a triannual magazine, Shūkanbunshun Woman, launched on 29 December 2019, Katori created a picture on a 1303 x 970 mm canvas. Shūkanbunshun is a well-established weekly magazine started in 1959, published by a leading Japanese publishing company, Kabushikigaisha Bungeishunjū (Bungeishunjū Ltd.). Shūkanbunshun Woman is its special edition targeting female readers. The picture is to be seen in Katori's exhibition "boum! boum! boum!" (see below).
Blog "kūsō fantejī" ("fantasy" in Japanese and in French). Starting from 1 January 2019, he has been posting a short fantasy story almost every day with a black-and-white picture he paints. These pictures form a part of his exhibition "boum! boum! boum!" (see below).
Painting "Freedom Gan’nen" ("First Year of Freedom"), exhibited in front of Tokyo Midtown Hibiya for the New Year's period of 2 – 14 January 2019, then in "boum! boum! boum!" (see below). Four canvases were made to a one big square canvas with a side longer than 4 meters. The character the creation features stands for a "pig" as 2019 is a year of the pig in Japanese traditional calendar with twelve earthly branches.
Exhibition "boum! boum! boum!" for 15 March – 16 June 2019 in IHI Stage Around Tokyo in Toyosu, Tokyo. Katori's first solo exhibition in Japan after the world's premiere in Paris in 2018. The event title "boum! boum! boum!" stands for a pounding heart in French. The concept of the exhibition, which is designed more like a show than an art exhibition, is "Looking inside Shingo Katori". After watching a short film on the seats of the innovative theater, in which the audience area rotates 360 degrees, the visitors are requested to step on to the stage with three separate segments where Katori's art pieces are installed. The exhibition catalogue also includes Katori's talks with noted artists, Tadanori Yoko'o and Makoto Aida.

Filmography

Film

Japanese dub

Television (as actor)

Television (as personality)

Radio

Theatre

Discography

Album

As Shingo Mama

Awards and nominations

Publications 
 Shingo no Itazura (December 1998) 
 DIET SHINGO (5 September 2003) 
 SNAP NO SHINGO (13 October 2006) 
 Fuku Baka Shifukubon (31 January 2014) 
 Shingo Jiten SD SHINGO DICTIONARY VOLUME 1 (28 July 2015)

References

External links

official Shingo Mama site 

1977 births
Living people
Japanese male pop singers
Japanese television personalities
Japanese male voice actors
Japanese idols
People from Yokohama
SMAP members
Musicians from Kanagawa Prefecture
Japanese comedy musicians
Taiga drama lead actors
21st-century Japanese singers
21st-century Japanese male singers